Horsepower (hp) is a unit of measurement of power, or the rate at which work is done, usually in reference to the output of engines or motors. There are many different standards and types of horsepower. Two common definitions used today are the mechanical horsepower (or imperial horsepower), which is about 745.7 watts, and the metric horsepower, which is approximately 735.5 watts.

The term was adopted in the late 18th century by Scottish engineer James Watt to compare the output of steam engines with the power of draft horses. It was later expanded to include the output power of other types of piston engines, as well as turbines, electric motors and other machinery. The definition of the unit varied among geographical regions. Most countries now use the SI unit watt for measurement of power. With the implementation of the EU Directive 80/181/EEC on 1 January 2010, the use of horsepower in the EU is permitted only as a supplementary unit.

History

The development of the steam engine provided a reason to compare the output of horses with that of the engines that could replace them. In 1702, Thomas Savery wrote in The Miner's Friend:

So that an engine which will raise as much water as two horses, working together at one time in such a work, can do, and for which there must be constantly kept ten or twelve horses for doing the same. Then I say, such an engine may be made large enough to do the work required in employing eight, ten, fifteen, or twenty horses to be constantly maintained and kept for doing such a work...

The idea was later used by James Watt to help market his improved steam engine. He had previously agreed to take royalties of one third of the savings in coal from the older Newcomen steam engines. This royalty scheme did not work with customers who did not have existing steam engines but used horses instead.

Watt determined that a horse could turn a mill wheel 144 times in an hour (or 2.4 times a minute). So:

Watt defined and calculated the horsepower as 32,572 ft⋅lbf/min, which was rounded to an even 33,000 ft⋅lbf/min.

A common legend states that the unit was created when one of Watt's first customers, a brewer, specifically demanded an engine that would match a horse, and chose the strongest horse he had and driving it to the limit. Watt accepted the challenge and built a machine that was actually even stronger than the figure achieved by the brewer, and the output of that machine became the horsepower.

In 1993, R. D. Stevenson and R. J. Wassersug published correspondence in Nature summarizing measurements and calculations of peak and sustained work rates of a horse.

When considering human-powered equipment, a healthy human can produce about  briefly (see orders of magnitude) and sustain about  indefinitely; trained athletes can manage up to about  briefly
The Jamaican sprinter Usain Bolt produced a maximum of  0.89 seconds into his 9.58 second  dash world record in 2009.

Calculating power
When torque  is in pound-foot units, rotational speed  is in rpm, the resulting power in horsepower is

 

The constant 5252 is the rounded value of (33,000 ft⋅lbf/min)/(2π rad/rev).

When torque  is in inch-pounds,

 

The constant 63,025 is the approximation of

Definitions

The following definitions have been or are widely used:

In certain situations it is necessary to distinguish between the various definitions of horsepower and thus a suffix is added: hp(I) for mechanical (or imperial) horsepower, hp(M) for metric horsepower, hp(S) for boiler (or steam) horsepower and hp(E) for electrical horsepower.

Mechanical horsepower
Assuming the third CGPM (1901, CR 70) definition of standard gravity, is used to define the pound-force as well as the kilogram force, and the international avoirdupois pound (1959), one mechanical horsepower is:

{|
|-
|1 hp
|≡ 33,000 ft·lbf/min
| colspan="2" |by definition
|-
|
|= 550 ft⋅lbf/s
|since
|1 min = 60 s
|-
|
|= 550 × 0.3048 × 0.45359237 m⋅kgf/s
|since
|1 ft ≡ 0.3048 m and 1 lb ≡ 0.45359237 kg
|-
|
|= 76.0402249 kgf⋅m/s
|
|
|-
|
|= 76.0402249 × 9.80665 kg⋅m2/s3
|since
|g = 9.80665 m/s2
|-
|
|= 745.6998715822702 W |≈ 745.700 W
|since
|1 W ≡ 1 J/s = 1 N⋅m/s = 1 (kg⋅m/s2)⋅(m/s)

|}

Or given that 1 hp = 550 ft⋅lbf/s, 1 ft = 0.3048 m, 1 lbf ≈ 4.448 N, 1 J = 1 N⋅m, 1 W = 1 J/s: 1 hp ≈ 746 W

Metric horsepower (PS, cv, hk, pk, ks, ch)

The various units used to indicate this definition (PS,  KM, cv, hk, pk, ks and ch) all translate to horse power in English. British manufacturers often intermix metric horsepower and mechanical horsepower depending on the origin of the engine in question.

DIN 66036 defines one metric horsepower as the power to raise a mass of 75 kilograms against the Earth's gravitational force over a distance of one metre in one second:  = 75 ⋅m/s = 1 PS. This is equivalent to 735.49875 W, or 98.6% of an imperial mechanical horsepower. In 1972, the PS was replaced by the kilowatt as the official power-measuring unit in EEC directives.

Other names for the metric horsepower are the Italian , Dutch , the French , the Spanish  and Portuguese , the Russian , the Swedish , the Finnish , the Estonian , the Norwegian and Danish , the Hungarian , the Czech  and Slovak  or ), the Bosnian/Croatian/Serbian , the Bulgarian , the Macedonian , the Polish , Slovenian , the Ukrainian , the Romanian , and the German .

In the 19th century, the French had their own unit, which they used instead of the CV or horsepower. Based on a 100 kgf⋅m/s standard, it was called the poncelet and was abbreviated p.

Tax horsepower

Tax or fiscal horsepower is a non-linear rating of a motor vehicle for tax purposes. Tax horsepower ratings were originally more or less directly related to the size of the engine; but as of 2000, many countries changed over to systems based on CO2 emissions, so are not directly comparable to older ratings. The Citroën 2CV is named for its French fiscal horsepower rating, "deux chevaux" (2CV).

Electrical horsepower

Nameplates on electrical motors show their power output, not the power input (the power delivered at the shaft, not the power consumed to drive the motor). This power output is ordinarily stated in watts or kilowatts. In the United States, the power output is stated in horsepower, which for this purpose is defined as exactly 746 W.

Hydraulic horsepower
Hydraulic horsepower can represent the power available within hydraulic machinery, power through the down-hole nozzle of a drilling rig, or can be used to estimate the mechanical power needed to generate a known hydraulic flow rate.

It may be calculated as
 
where pressure is in psi, and flow rate is in US gallons per minute.

Drilling rigs are powered mechanically by rotating the drill pipe from above. Hydraulic power is still needed though, as 1 500 to 5 000 W are required to push mud through the drill bit to clear waste rock. Additional hydraulic power may also be used to drive a down-hole mud motor to power directional drilling.

When using SI units, the equation becomes coherent and there is no dividing constant.

 
where pressure is in pascals (Pa), and flow rate is in cubic metres per second (m3).

Boiler horsepower
Boiler horsepower is a boiler's capacity to deliver steam to a steam engine and is not the same unit of power as the 550 ft lb/s definition. In the early days of steam use, the boiler horsepower was roughly comparable to the horsepower of engines fed by the boiler.

The term "boiler horsepower" was originally developed at the Philadelphia Centennial Exhibition in 1876, where the best steam engines of that period were tested. A few years later in 1884, the ASME re-defined the boiler horsepower as the thermal output equal to the evaporation of 34.5 pounds per hour of water "from and at" . This considerably simplified boiler testing, and provided more accurate comparisons of the boilers at that time.

Boiler horsepower is still used to measure boiler output in industrial boiler engineering in the US. Boiler horsepower is abbreviated BHP, not to be confused with brake horsepower, below, which is also abbreviated BHP.

Drawbar power

Drawbar power (dbp) is the power a railway locomotive has available to haul a train or an agricultural tractor to pull an implement. This is a measured figure rather than a calculated one. A special railway car called a dynamometer car coupled behind the locomotive keeps a continuous record of the drawbar pull exerted, and the speed. From these, the power generated can be calculated. To determine the maximum power available, a controllable load is required; it is normally a second locomotive with its brakes applied, in addition to a static load.

If the drawbar force is measured in pounds-force (lbf) and speed is measured in miles per hour (mph), then the drawbar power in horsepower (hp) is

 

Example: How much power is needed to pull a drawbar load of 2,025 pounds-force at 5 miles per hour?

 

The constant 375 is because 1 hp = 375 lbf⋅mph. If other units are used, the constant is different. When using coherent SI units (watts, newtons, and metres per second), no constant is needed, and the formula becomes .

This formula may also be used to calculate the power of a jet engine, using the speed of the jet and the thrust required to maintain that speed.

Example: how much power is generated with a thrust of 4 000 pounds at 400 miles per hour?

RAC horsepower (taxable horsepower)

This measure was instituted by the Royal Automobile Club and was used to denote the power of early 1900s British cars. Many cars took their names from this figure (hence the Austin Seven and Riley Nine), while others had names such as "40/50 hp", which indicated the RAC figure followed by the true measured power.

Taxable horsepower does not reflect developed horsepower; rather, it is a calculated figure based on the engine's bore size, number of cylinders, and a (now archaic) presumption of engine efficiency. As new engines were designed with ever-increasing efficiency, it was no longer a useful measure, but was kept in use by UK regulations, which used the rating for tax purposes. The United Kingdom was not the only country that used the RAC rating; many states in Australia used RAC hp to determine taxation. The RAC formula was sometimes applied in British colonies as well, such as Kenya (British East Africa).

 

where

 D is the diameter (or bore) of the cylinder in inches,
 n is the number of cylinders.

Since taxable horsepower was computed based on bore and number of cylinders, not based on actual displacement, it gave rise to engines with "undersquare" dimensions (bore smaller than stroke), which tended to impose an artificially low limit on rotational speed, hampering the potential power output and efficiency of the engine.

See, for example, the early Chrysler Hemi engine.

Measurement

The power of an engine may be measured or estimated at several points in the transmission of the power from its generation to its application. A number of names are used for the power developed at various stages in this process, but none is a clear indicator of either the measurement system or definition used.

In general:
indicated or gross horsepower is the theoretical capability of the engine [PLAN/ 33000];
brake/net/crankshaft horsepower (power delivered directly to and measured at the engine's crankshaft) equals
indicated horsepower minus frictional losses within the engine (bearing drag, rod and crankshaft windage losses, oil film drag, etc.);
shaft horsepower (power delivered to and measured at the output shaft of the transmission, when present in the system) equals
crankshaft horsepower minus frictional losses in the transmission (bearings, gears, oil drag, windage, etc.);
effective, true (thp) or commonly referred to as wheel horsepower (whp) equals
shaft horsepower minus frictional losses in the universal joint/s, differential, wheel bearings, tire and chain, (if present).

All the above assumes that no power inflation factors have been applied to any of the readings.

Engine designers use expressions other than horsepower to denote objective targets or performance, such as brake mean effective pressure (BMEP). This is a coefficient of theoretical brake horsepower and cylinder pressures during combustion.

Nominal horsepower
Nominal horsepower (nhp) is an early 19th-century rule of thumb used to estimate the power of steam engines.

Nominal horsepower = 7 × area of piston in square inches × equivalent piston speed in feet per minute/33,000.

For paddle ships, the Admiralty rule was that the piston speed in feet per minute was taken as 129.7 × (stroke)1/3.38. For screw steamers, the intended piston speed was used.

The stroke (or length of stroke) was the distance moved by the piston measured in feet.

For the nominal horsepower to equal the actual power it would be necessary for the mean steam pressure in the cylinder during the stroke to be  and for the piston speed to be that generated by the assumed relationship for paddle ships.

The French Navy used the same definition of nominal horse power as the Royal Navy.

Indicated horsepower
Indicated horsepower (ihp) is the theoretical power of a reciprocating engine if it is completely frictionless in converting the expanding gas energy (piston pressure × displacement) in the cylinders. It is calculated from the pressures developed in the cylinders, measured by a device called an engine indicator – hence indicated horsepower. As the piston advances throughout its stroke, the pressure against the piston generally decreases, and the indicator device usually generates a graph of pressure vs stroke within the working cylinder. From this graph the amount of work performed during the piston stroke may be calculated.

Indicated horsepower was a better measure of engine power than nominal horsepower (nhp) because it took account of steam pressure. But unlike later measures such as shaft horsepower (shp) and brake horsepower (bhp), it did not take into account power losses due to the machinery internal frictional losses, such as a piston sliding within the cylinder, plus bearing friction, transmission and gear box friction, etc.

Brake horsepower
Brake horsepower (bhp) is the power measured using a brake type (load) dynamometer at a specified location, such as the crankshaft, output shaft of the transmission, rear axle or rear wheels.

In Europe, the DIN 70020 standard tests the engine fitted with all ancillaries and the exhaust system as used in the car. The older American standard (SAE gross horsepower, referred to as bhp) used an engine without alternator, water pump, and other auxiliary components such as power steering pump, muffled exhaust system, etc., so the figures were higher than the European figures for the same engine. The newer American standard (referred to as SAE net horsepower) tests an engine with all the auxiliary components (see "Engine power test standards" below).

Brake refers to the device which is used to provide an equal braking force / load to balance / equal an engine's output force and hold it at a desired rotational speed. During testing, the output torque and rotational speed are measured to determine the brake horsepower. Horsepower was originally measured and calculated by use of the "indicator diagram" (a James Watt invention of the late 18th century), and later by means of a Prony brake connected to the engine's output shaft. Modern dynamometers use any of several braking methods to measure the engine's brake horsepower, the actual output of the engine itself, before losses to the drivetrain.

Shaft horsepower
Shaft horsepower (shp) is the power delivered to a propeller shaft, a turbine shaft, or to an output shaft of an automotive transmission. Shaft horsepower is a common rating for turboshaft and turboprop engines, industrial turbines, and some marine applications.

Equivalent shaft horsepower (eshp) is sometimes used to rate turboprop engines. It includes the equivalent power derived from residual jet thrust from the turbine exhaust.  of residual jet thrust is estimated to be produced from one unit of horsepower.

Engine power test standards
There exist a number of different standard determining how the power and torque of an automobile engine is measured and corrected. Correction factors are used to adjust power and torque measurements to standard atmospheric conditions, to provide a more accurate comparison between engines as they are affected by the pressure, humidity, and temperature of ambient air. Some standards are described below.

Society of Automotive Engineers/SAE International

Early "SAE horsepower" (see RAC horsepower for the formula)
In the early twentieth century, a so-called "SAE horsepower" was sometimes quoted for U.S. automobiles. This long predates the Society of Automotive Engineers (SAE) horsepower measurement standards and was another name for the industry standard ALAM or NACC horsepower figure and the same as the British RAC horsepower also used for tax purposes. Alliance for Automotive Innovation is the current successor of ALAM and NACC.

SAE gross power
Prior to the 1972 model year, American automakers rated and advertised their engines in brake horsepower, bhp, which was a version of brake horsepower called SAE gross horsepower because it was measured according to Society of Automotive Engineers (SAE) standards (J245 and J1995) that call for a stock test engine without accessories (such as dynamo/alternator, radiator fan, water pump), and sometimes fitted with long tube test headers in lieu of the OEM exhaust manifolds. This contrasts with both SAE net power and DIN 70020 standards, which account for engine accessories (but not transmission losses). The atmospheric correction standards for barometric pressure, humidity and temperature for SAE gross power testing were relatively idealistic.

SAE net power
In the United States, the term bhp fell into disuse in 1971–1972, as automakers began to quote power in terms of SAE net horsepower in accord with SAE standard J1349. Like SAE gross and other brake horsepower protocols, SAE net hp is measured at the engine's crankshaft, and so does not account for transmission losses. However, similar to the DIN 70020 standard, SAE net power testing protocol calls for standard production-type belt-driven accessories, air cleaner, emission controls, exhaust system, and other power-consuming accessories. This produces ratings in closer alignment with the power produced by the engine as it is actually configured and sold.

SAE certified power
In 2005, the SAE introduced "SAE Certified Power" with SAE J2723. To attain certification the test must follow the SAE standard in question, take place in an ISO 9000/9002 certified facility and be witnessed by an SAE approved third party.

A few manufacturers such as Honda and Toyota switched to the new ratings immediately. The first engine certified under the new program was the 7.0 L LS7 used in the 2006 Chevrolet Corvette Z06.

While Toyota and Honda are retesting their entire vehicle lineups, other automakers generally are retesting only those with updated powertrains. However, the 2006 rating does not reflect the new SAE testing procedure, as Ford is not going to incur the extra expense of retesting its existing engines. Over time, most automakers are expected to comply with the new guidelines.

SAE tightened its horsepower rules to eliminate the opportunity for engine manufacturers to manipulate factors affecting performance such as how much oil was in the crankcase, engine control system calibration, and whether an engine was tested with high octane fuel. In some cases, such can add up to a change in horsepower ratings.

Deutsches Institut für Normung 70020 (DIN 70020)
DIN 70020 is a German DIN standard for measuring road vehicle horsepower. DIN hp is measured at the engine's output shaft as a form of metric horsepower rather than mechanical horsepower. Similar to SAE net power rating, and unlike SAE gross power, DIN testing measures the engine as installed in the vehicle, with cooling system, charging system and stock exhaust system all connected. DIN hp is often abbreviated as "PS", derived from the German word Pferdestärke (literally, "horsepower").

CUNA
A test standard by Italian CUNA (Commissione Tecnica per l'Unificazione nell'Automobile, Technical Commission for Automobile Unification), a federated entity of standards organisation UNI, was formerly used in Italy.
CUNA prescribed that the engine be tested with all accessories necessary to its running fitted (such as the water pump), while all others – such as alternator/dynamo, radiator fan, and exhaust manifold – could be omitted. All calibration and accessories had to be as on production engines.

Economic Commission for Europe R24
ECE R24 is a UN standard for the approval of compression ignition engine emissions, installation and measurement of engine power. It is similar to DIN 70020 standard, but with different requirements for connecting an engine's fan during testing causing it to absorb less power from the engine.

Economic Commission for Europe R85
ECE R85 is a UN standard for the approval of internal combustion engines with regard to the measurement of the net power.

80/1269/EEC
80/1269/EEC of 16 December 1980 is a European Union standard for road vehicle engine power.

International Organization for Standardization
The International Organization for Standardization (ISO) publishes several standards for measuring engine horsepower.
 ISO 14396 specifies the additional and method requirement for determining the power of reciprocating internal combustion engines when presented for an ISO 8178 exhaust emission test. It applies to reciprocating internal combustion engines for land, rail and marine use excluding engines of motor vehicles primarily designed for road use.
 ISO 1585 is an engine net power test code intended for road vehicles.
 ISO 2534 is an engine gross power test code intended for road vehicles.
 ISO 4164 is an engine net power test code intended for mopeds.
 ISO 4106 is an engine net power test code intended for motorcycles.
 ISO 9249 is an engine net power test code intended for earth moving machines.

Japanese Industrial Standard D 1001
JIS D 1001 is a Japanese net, and gross, engine power test code for automobiles or trucks having a spark ignition, diesel engine, or fuel injection engine.

See also
 Brake-specific fuel consumption – how much fuel an engine consumes per unit energy output
 Dynamometer engine testing
 European units of measurement directives
 Horsepower-hour
 Mean effective pressure
 Torque

References

External links

 How Much Horsepower Does a Horse Have?
 How Stuff Works: Horsepower

Imperial units
Units of power
Customary units of measurement in the United States
James Watt